Memories of My Father, also known as Forgotten We'll Be, is a 2020 Colombian drama film directed by Fernando Trueba from a screenplay by David Trueba based on the book by Héctor Abad Faciolince. It stars Javier Cámara as Héctor Abad Gómez.

It was selected as the Colombian entry for the Best International Feature Film at the 93rd Academy Awards.

Cast

Release
The film was selected to be shown at the 2020 Cannes Film Festival, which was cancelled in the wake of the onset of the COVID-19 pandemic. It was released theatrically in Colombia on 22 August 2020. It landed its international premiere at the 68th San Sebastián International Film Festival. Cohen Media Group released the film in the United States on 16 November 2022.

Accolades 

|-
| rowspan = "21" align = "center" | 2021 || 35th Goya Awards || colspan = "2" | Best Ibero-American Film ||  || align = "center" | 
|-
| rowspan = "11" | 8th Platino Awards ||  colspan = "2" | Best Ibero-American Film ||  || rowspan = "11" | 
|-
| Best Director || Fernando Trueba || 
|-
| Best Actor || Javier Cámara || 
|-
| Best Supporting Actress || Kami Zea || 
|-
| Best Screenplay || David Trueba || 
|-
| Best Original Score || Zbigniew Preisner || 
|-
| Best Cinematography || Sergio Iván Castaño || 
|-
| Best Art Direction || Diego López || 
|-
| Best Film Editing || Marta Velasco || 
|-
| Best Sound || Eduardo Castro, Octavio Rojas y Alberto Ovejero || 
|-
| colspan = "2" | Cinema and Education in Values || 
|-
| rowspan = "9" | 9th Macondo Awards || colspan = "2" | Best Picture ||  || rowspan = "9" | 
|-
| Best Director || Fernando Trueba || 
|-
| Best Actor || Javier Cámara || 
|-
| Best Actress || Patricia Tamayo || 
|-
| Best Cinematography || Sergio Iván Castaño || 
|-
| Best Art Direction || Diego López || 
|-
| Best Sound Design || Eduardo Castro, Octavio Rojas, César Salazar ||  
|-
| Best Costume Design || Ana María Urrea || 
|-
| Best Makeup || Laura Copo || 
|}

See also
 List of submissions to the 93rd Academy Awards for Best International Feature Film
 List of Colombian submissions for the Academy Award for Best International Feature Film

References

External links
 

2020 films
2020 drama films
Colombian drama films
2020s Spanish-language films
Films directed by Fernando Trueba
Films set in Colombia
2020s Colombian films